Horn is a surname. Notable people with the surname include:

Alan F. Horn (born 1943), American entertainment industry executive
Albert Horn (1840–1921), German politician
Alfred Aloysius "Trader" Horn (1861–1931), trader in Africa during the "Scramble for Africa"
Alfred Horn (1918–2001), American mathematician
Andrew Horn (died 1328) fishmonger, of Bridge Street, London, Chamberlain of the city (1320-8), author of Liber Horn
Andrew Horn (filmmaker) (born 1952), American film producer, director and writer
Anton Ludwig Ernst Horn (1774-1848), German physician
Count Arvid Horn (1664–1742), Swedish statesman
Blair Horn, Canadian rower
Bob Horn (broadcaster) (1916–1966), American radio and television personality
Brita Horn (1745-1791), Swedish courtier and letter writer
Bruce Horn (born 1960), American programmer
Carl von Horn (1847–1923), Bavarian general and War Minister
Carl von Horn (1903–1989), Swedish general
Charles Edward Horn (1786-1849), English composer
Cody Horn (born 1988), American actress and model
Corran Horn, fictional character in Star Wars Legends
Dave van Horn (born 1960), American baseball coach
David Bayne Horn (1901–1969), British historian
Dimitris Horn (1921–1998), Greek actor
Don Horn (born 1945), American football quarterback
Evert Horn (1585-1615), Swedish soldier
Frederick W. Horn, American lawyer and politician
Frederik Winkel-Horn (1756–1837), Danish writer
Frederik Winkel Horn (1845–1898), Danish writer and translator
Gabriel Horn (1927–2012), British biologist
George Henry Horn (1840–1897), U.S. entomologist
Greg Horn, American comic book artist
Guildo Horn (born 1963), German singer
Gustav Horn, Count of Pori (1592–1657), Swedish/Finnish soldier and politician
Gyula Horn (1932–2013), Prime Minister of Hungary 1994–98
Harvey Horn (born 1995), British boxer
Hassa Horn Jr. (1873–1968), Norwegian engineer and industrialist
Jaycee Horn (born 1999), American football player
Jeff Horn, Australian boxer
Jeremy Horn (born 1975), American mixed martial artist
Jim Horn (born 1940), American musician
Joan Kelly Horn (born 1936), Missourian politician
Joe Horn (born 1972), American football player
Joe Horn Jr. (born 1994), American football player & son of Joe Horn
Joseph M. Horn, American psychologist
Julian Horn-Smith, British businessman
Kaniehtiio Horn (born 1986), Canadian actress
Kate Horn (1826–1896), Canadian stage actress and director
Karl Friedrich Horn (1762-1830), English composer
Keith Van Horn (born 1975), American basketball player
Kendra Horn, (1976-), US Representative (2019-)
Laurence R. Horn (born 1945), American linguist
Lawrence Horn (died 2017), American record producer
Marie-Louise Horn (1912–1991), German tennis player
Michael "J" Horn (born 1979), American musician and musical director
Michelle Horn (born 1987), American actress
Michiel Horn (born 1939), Canadian historian
Mike Horn (born 1966), Swiss explorer and adventurer
Milton Horn (1906–1995), Russian-American sculptor
Noel Van Horn (born 1968), American born Canadian comic book artist
Paul Horn (musician) (1930–2014), American jazz flautist and saxophonist
Paul Horn (computer scientist) (born 1946), American computer scientist and solid state physicist
Philipp Horn (born 1994), German biathlete
Philippe Emanuel de Hornes
Rebecca Horn (born 1944), German installation artist
Roni Horn (born 1955), American visual artist and writer
Roy Horn (1944–2020), German-American entertainer
Rudolf Horn (born 1954), Austrian biathlete and cross-country skier
Sally P. Horn (born 1958), American geographer
Sam Horn (born 1963), American baseball player
Shifra Horn (born 1951), Israeli author
Shirley Horn (1934–2005), American jazz singer and musician
Siegbert Horn (1950–2016), East German slalom canoeist
Siegfried Horn (1908–1993), American archaeologist and Bible scholar
Steve Horn (1931–2011), university president and U.S. Congressman
Taylor Horn (born 1992), American singer
Ted Horn (1919–1948), American race car driver
Timo Horn (born 1993), German professional footballer
Tom Horn (1860–1903), American scout
Tor Egil Horn (born 1976), Norwegian footballer
Trevor Horn (born 1949), British musician
Wade Horn (born 1976), American psychologist
Walter Horn (1908–1995), German-born US academic
Walther Hermann Richard Horn (1871–1939), German entomologist
Welby Van Horn (1920–2014), American tennis player
Werner D. Horn, American politician
William Horn (1841–1922), Australian mining magnate, pastoralist, politician, author, sculptor and philanthropist
William Van Horn (born 1939), American comic book artist

Families
Horn family, Swedish nobility
House of Hornes

See also
Hoorn (disambiguation)
Horn (disambiguation)
Horne (surname)

German-language surnames